In enzymology, a glutamine N-acyltransferase is an enzyme that catalyzes the chemical reaction

acyl-CoA + L-glutamine  CoA + N-acyl-L-glutamine

Thus, the two substrates of this enzyme are acyl-CoA and L-glutamine, whereas its two products are CoA and N-acyl-L-glutamine.

This enzyme belongs to the family of transferases, specifically those acyltransferases transferring groups other than aminoacyl groups.  The systematic name of this enzyme class is acyl-CoA:L-glutamine N-acyltransferase.

References

 

EC 2.3.1
Enzymes of unknown structure